Sambour is a district located in Kratié province, in Cambodia.

Districts of Kratié province